Blything was a hundred of eastern Suffolk, and with an area of  was the largest of Suffolk's 21 hundreds.

The origins of the hundred centre on the ancient royal estate of Blythburgh, whose hall housed the hundred's central meeting place.

Listed as Blidinga in the Domesday Book, the hundred's name means "the people of the Blyth" a subgroup of the Iceni who populated the valleys of the River Blyth; the hundred corresponds closely to the drainage basin of the River Blyth together with other minor rivers. The name "Blyth" itself means 'blithe' or 'pleasant' and shares its name with a river in Northamptonshire, and one in Northumberland.

Parishes

Blything Hundred consisted of the following parishes:

References

External links
Blything Hundred: A study in the Development of Settlement, 400-1400 AD
Blything Hundred wiki

Hundreds of Suffolk